Give Up is a 2003 album by The Postal Service.

Give Up may also refer to:

 Give Up (EP), by Miles Kane, 2013
 "Give Up", a song by Diana Ross from Diana, 1980
 "Give Up", a song by CSS from Donkey, 2008
 "Give Up?", a song by Hot Hot Heat from Happiness Ltd., 2007

See also 
 "Given Up", a song by Linkin Park
 Give It Up (disambiguation)
 Giving Up (disambiguation)